Rodrigo Pezzota (born October 31, 1984 in Rosario), is an Argentinian professional squash player. He reached a career-high world ranking of World No. 140 in December 2014. Rodrigo won the bronze medal at the 2015 Pan American Games.

References

External links 
 
 
 

1984 births
Living people
Argentine male squash players
Pan American Games bronze medalists for Argentina
Pan American Games medalists in squash
Squash players at the 2003 Pan American Games
Squash players at the 2015 Pan American Games
Medalists at the 2015 Pan American Games